The Barbellion Prize is a British literary award "dedicated to the furtherance of ill and disabled voices in writing". It is awarded annually to a writer, in any genre, who has a chronic illness or is living with a disability. The prize was founded in 2020 by Jake Goldsmith, who has cystic fibrosis and whose memoir Neither Weak nor Obtuse was published in 2022 by Sagging Meniscus Books. It is named after the pseudonymous W. N. P. Barbellion (1889-1919; real name Bruce Frederick Cummings), the author of The Journal of a Disappointed Man, who had multiple sclerosis and died at the age of 30.

The prize is international and is open to new translations into English, and to self-published works, but not to unpublished work. Eligibility is "predicated on the author's presentation of life with a long-term chronic illness or disability ... that may substantially define one's life", and "Authors - such as those in a carer's capacity - who themselves are not disabled may be considered for the prize if their work is truly exceptional as an articulation of life with illness" but they will be given lower priority. The winner receives £1,000, a glass trophy, and a copy of Barbellion's The Journal of a Disappointed Man.

Winners

2020
 Golem Girl: a memoir by the artist Riva Lehrer, who has spina bifida (Virago)

2021
 What Willow Says by Lynn Buckle, who is Deaf: a novel about a deaf child and her grandmother and their use of sign language (Époque Press)

2022
 Book of Hours: An Almanac for The Seasons of The Soul by Letty McHugh, who  has multiple sclerosis. The book is self-published and available online.

References

External links

British literary awards
2020 establishments in the United Kingdom
Awards established in 2020
Literary awards honoring writers
Writers with disabilities 
Disability culture